Union Bank was a Pakistani bank based in Karachi, Pakistan. It was established in 1991 with its headquarters in Lahore, Pakistan. In 2000 the bank relocated its headquarters to Karachi.

Prior to the merger with Standard Chartered Bank in 2006, it was Pakistan's eighth largest bank and had 65 branches in some 22 cities, about US$2 billion in assets, and about 400,000 customers.

History
In 2000, Union Bank acquired Bank of America's operations in Pakistan. Then in July 2001, Union Bank signed an Independent Operator agreement for American Express Cards in Pakistan. In 2002, Union Bank acquired the operations in Pakistan of Emirates Bank International. This purchase helped Union Bank become one of the larger private banks in the country.

In 2006, Standard Chartered Bank acquired 81% of Union Bank's shares for US$413 million. Under Pakistani law, it had to delist Union Bank and make an offer for the outstanding shares; the offer raised the total purchase price to about US$511. On 30 December 2006, Standard Chartered merged Union Bank with its own subsidiary in Pakistan, which has 46 branches in 10 cities. The merged bank is named Standard Chartered Bank (Pakistan) and is now Pakistan's sixth largest bank.

See also

 Standard Chartered Pakistan

References

External links 
 Standard Chartered Pakistan

Defunct banks of Pakistan
Standard Chartered
Pakistani companies established in 1991
Banks established in 1991
Banks disestablished in 2006
Mergers and acquisitions of Pakistani companies
2006 mergers and acquisitions
Pakistani companies disestablished in 2006